Marchondray James "Dre" Moore (born June 9, 1985) is a former American football defensive tackle in the National Football League (NFL) and Arena Football League (AFL). He was drafted by the Tampa Bay Buccaneers in the fourth round of the 2008 NFL Draft. He played college football at the University of Maryland.

He was also a member of the Jacksonville Jaguars and Tampa Bay Storm.

Early years
Moore played high school football at Independence High School in Charlotte, North Carolina.  He did not start playing football until he was asked to join the junior varsity team as a junior. As a senior, he totaled 107 tackles and three sacks, and earned First-team All-State by the Associated Press. He also helped lead his team to a 16-0 record and a win in the state championship.

College career
Moore played college football at The University of Maryland, College Park. As a senior, he Earned first-team All-Conference honors. He finished his college career starting 26 of 44 games with 10.5 sacks. He graduated with a degree in Family Studies.

Professional career

Tampa Bay Buccaneers
Moore was drafted by the Tampa Bay Buccaneers in the fourth round of the 2008 NFL Draft. On August 30, he was waived by the team during final cuts. The Buccaneers re-signed him to the practice squad two days later on September 1. He appeared in his first NFL game during week 10 of the 2009 season against the Miami Dolphins. He finished the season with five tackles in seven games. Moore was waived during final cuts on September 4, 2010.

Jacksonville Jaguars
On November 13, 2010, Moore was signed to the practice squad of the Jaguars after having undergone previous workouts for a number of other teams, including the Philadelphia Eagles.

Tampa Bay Storm
On July 25, 2013, Moore was assigned to the Tampa Bay Storm of the Arena Football League. On January 31, 2014, Moore announced his retirement.

References

External links

Tampa Bay Buccaneers bio
Maryland Terrapins bio

1985 births
Living people
Players of American football from Charlotte, North Carolina
American football defensive tackles
Maryland Terrapins football players
Tampa Bay Buccaneers players
Jacksonville Jaguars players
Tampa Bay Storm players